The red-bellied annulate keelback or ringed water snake (Trimerodytes annularis) is a species of snake in the family Colubridae. It is found in Taiwan and eastern China.

References 

Reptiles described in 1856
Taxa named by Edward Hallowell (herpetologist)
Trimerodytes
Reptiles of China
Reptiles of Taiwan